Moniteau Creek is a stream in Randolph, Howard and Boone counties in the U.S. state of Missouri. The headwaters of the stream are southwest of Moberly in Randolph County. The stream flows south passing into Howard County in the Rudolph Bennett Conservation Area. The stream flows south-southwest along the eastern part of the county passing under Missouri Route 124 and becomes the boundary between Howard and Boone counties before passing under U. S. Route 40 and entering the Missouri River just south of Rocheport.

Moniteau Creek derives its name from the Indian term Manitou.

See also
List of rivers of Missouri

References

Rivers of Boone County, Missouri
Rivers of Howard County, Missouri
Rivers of Randolph County, Missouri
Rivers of Missouri